Palagonia (Sicilian: Palagunìa, Latin: Palica) is a comune (municipality) in the Metropolitan City of Catania in the Italian region Sicily, located about  southeast of Palermo and about  southwest of Catania. Palagonia borders the following municipalities: Lentini, Militello in Val di Catania, Mineo, Ramacca.

Palagonia is well-known for the cultivation of oranges.

The main catholic church is the Chiesa Madre San Pietro Apostolo.

See also
Palagonia double homicide

References

External links
 Official website
Special St. Febronia Worldwide

Cities and towns in Sicily